P. illyricum may refer to:
 Pancratium illyricum, a flowering plant species
 Polystichum illyricum, a fern hybrid species

See also
 O. illyricum (Onopordum illyricum)